Geita Region (Mkoa wa Geita in Swahili) is one of Tanzania's 31 administrative regions. The region is comparable in size to the combined land area of the nation state of Slovenia. Geita Region is bordered to the east by Lake Victoria, Mwanza Region and Shinyanga Region. The region is bordered by Tabora Region and Kigoma Region to the south and south west respectively. Lastly, Gieta is borders Kagera Region to the west.

According to national census of 2022, the region had 2,977,608 and national census was 1,739,530.Geita Region is among top 5 region with high growth rate.

The region's city (capital) is the town of Geita. The region is named after the town of Geita itself. The region is home to Tanzania's largest gold mining industries and was also home to Tanzania's fifth president, the late John Magufuli.

Geography 

The region lies between latitudes 2°8' and 3°28' South of the equator and longitudes 31° 15' and 32° 48' East of Greenwich, the Geita Region is situated in Tanzania's northern west. It shares borders with five other regions: Kagera Region to the west and north-west; Tabora and Shinyanga Regions to the south; Shinyanga Region to the south-east; Kigoma Region to the south and south-west; and Mwanza Region to the north and north-east. The region is 1,100 to 1,300 meters above sea level. In the north, the waters of Lake Victoria also encircle the area.

Climate 
The primary wet season is from February to May, with the smaller wet season between September to December. The dry season is from June to September.

History 
The area was created in March 2012 from sections of the Shinyanga, Kagera, and Mwanza Regions. created were six councils total, one of which is the town council, and five districts from portions of the Shinyanga, Mwanza, and Kagera Regions.

Demographics 
The area that is now Geita Region has been inhabited by Bantu peoples for thousands of years. The majority of the people are Basukuma and Sumbwa. There are additionally many Haya, Zinza, and Nyamwezi in the region. The area is the ancestral home to the Zinza people who live on the shore of Lake Victoria.

In 2016 the Tanzania National Bureau of Statistics report there were 1,932,230 in the region, from 1,739,530 in 2012.

Economy 
Geita's economy is dominated by the extraction industry especially the mining gold. The Geita Gold Mine is the largest mining operation located within Geita Region, 4 km west of the town of Geita. The mine is currently being owned and managed by AngloGold Ashanti. Other major industries in the region is agriculture and fishing.

Two paved trunk roads pass through the region from east to west: road T3 (from Kahama to the Rwanda border), passes through the south of the region, while road T4 (from Mwanza to Bukoba) passes through the north of the region.

Rubondo Island National Park is located on an island in Lake Victoria that is a part of Geita Region. It can be reached by ferry from Geita and Chato Districts.

Currently the Kigongo–Busisi Bridge is being built to connect the Mwanza Region to the Geita Region across the Gulf of Mwanza of Lake Victoria.

Administrative divisions 
The region has 6 council districts, 122 wards, 474 villages, and 2,219 hamlets.

Districts 
Geita Region is divided into six councils. One town council of Geita, and 5 districts councils:

Gallery

Notable people from Geita Region 
 John Magufuli - Tanzania's fifth president

References

External links

 

 
Regions of Tanzania
States and territories established in 2012
2012 establishments in Tanzania